Bidwell may refer to:

People
Bidwell (surname)

Places
Bidwell, Bedfordshire
Bidwell, Missouri
Bidwell, Ohio
Bidwell, Ontario
Bidwell Bar Bridge, two suspension bridges in Oroville, California
Bidwell Mansion State Historic Park, Chico, California
Bidwell Park, municipal park in Chico, California
Bidwell-Sacramento River State Park, Butte County, California
Bidwell's Bar, California, gold-mining camp
Fort Bidwell, California

Companies
The Bidwell Bean Thresher Company, a manufacturer of bean threshing machines

See also
Bidhawal, an Australian Aboriginal tribe
Bidwill (disambiguation)
Bedwell (disambiguation)